The Asian Tennis Federation (ATF) is a non-profit organization affiliated with the International Tennis Federation. It is a continental body of national tennis associations of Asian countries. The ATF's main objectives are to raise the quality standard of Asian tennis and to popularize tennis sport among the peoples of Asia. There are currently 44 member associations who represents their respective nations. The ATF works closely with the International Tennis Federation (ITF) and supports its member associations through the implementation of a wide range of programs.

Board of directors
The board of directors is the elected group of members from national tennis bodies of Asian nations, the current list of members is:-

Challenges
Asia is by far the most populous continent but tennis still remains a sport under development. Besides a couple of Asian nations like India, China and Japan who have produced some world class players, tennis does not have a very long and fruitful history. The only Asians to ever win a single tennis grand slam are Li Na from China ( French Open 2011 and Australian Open 2014), Naomi Osaka from Japan (Australian Open 2019 and 2021, US Opens 2018 and 2021), and Elena Rybakina from Kazakhstan (Wimbledon 2022). The only 2 nations that ever qualified for a Davis cup final are India(3) and Japan. No Asian nation has ever won the Davis Cup (excluding the Junior Davis Cups, 2 of which are won by Japan in 2011 and 2019). 

Li Na grew up playing badminton and only switched over to tennis because a coach saw her potential for the sport. But the backward Chinese tennis coaching she received in her early days actually turned her against the game and she eventually quit for two years only to come back when China tennis authorities allowed her to take the reins and hire a coach to her liking without regards of the costs. "After Li Na had won the two grandslam tournaments, everyone start to know tennis in China. Especially in a country like China interest in the tennis sport is very much at the lead level compared to other Asian countries. If you weren't a lead level player, maybe you are wasting your time, taking away from study or education. But we've really seen in the last couple of years that mindset changing, in China in particular",  said Ben Slack, Tennis Australia's head of international business. 

The Women's Tennis Association announced in 2017 that it has signed a 10-year deal to move its finals tournament to Shenzhen, a dynamic city in China south, starting from next year. The deal will also see the total prize money on offer double to a whopping US$14 million.

Tennis is expensive and most Asian countries are still a developing economy, which means the standard of living is comparatively less and people spend their money on necessities rather than tennis racquets. There are currently 289 futures and challengers in a year in Europe, while Asia in comparison only has 61 of these tournaments. Even South America, where there are only twelve nations and players from the other continents rarely go due to remoteness of the location, has 81 ATP recognized tournaments The number of tournaments in Asia is increasing and with it the level of the sport. In the next 10 years, the Asian region, should produce some exciting players.

Sponsors of ATF
This is a list of official sponsors of ATF:
Wilson
California Products – Official Supplier of Court Surfaces
Yonex – Official Racket of the Asian Tennis Federation
Rebound Ace
All India Tennis Association
Lawn Tennis Association of Thailand
Sri Lanka Tennis Association
Qatar Tennis Federation
Uzbekistan Tennis Federation

References

External links

 
Tennis organizations
Sports governing bodies in Asia
Tennis in Asia